Miship, or Chip, is an Afro-Asiatic language spoken in Plateau State, Nigeria. Doka is a dialect. Blench lists the two dialects Longmaar and Jiɓaam.

The Chip people are found in Pankshin LGA.

People
The traditional occupation of Chip people is farming. The people worship Na'an (God). Oral tradition states that they migrated from Kanem-Bornu to their present homeland with other tribes, Ngas, Mupun, and Mwaghavul.

Most Chip names are unisex, so in order to differentiate a man from a woman, the prefix Na is added to the woman's name and Da is added to the man's. For example, for a man and a woman both sharing Nandi, the man would be Danan, and the woman Nanan.

Words
God - Na'an / Nan
Father - Nda
Child - La
Girl - Larep
Wash - Vang
Person - Gurum
Rain - Fuan/Fwan
Children - Jep
Food - Sehh/ Gwom/Mun

Rice - Kapa
Acha - Kuzuk
Soup - Tok 
Chicken - Co
Dog - As
Goat - Irr
Meat - Lu

Lu ('meat') is used to specifically refer to meat from animals. For example, 'chicken' would be Lu Co.

Phrases
What is your name - Sim yi awe? (girl); Sim gih awe? (boy)
Good night - Nan yakal kih mun
Bye - Sai dih darr
Good morning - Tehra

Numbers
One - Kihme
Two - Vul
Three - Kun
Four - Ferre
Five - Pa'ad

Notes 

Languages of Nigeria
West Chadic languages